Hans Engelsen Eide (born 8 May 1965) is a Norwegian freestyle skier. He was born in Voss, and represented the club Voss Freestyleklubb. He competed at the 1994 Winter Olympics in Lillehammer, where he placed 15th in moguls.

He was Norwegian champion in moguls in 1984, 1985, 1987, 1988, 1989, 1990, 1991 and 1994.

References

External links

1965 births
Living people
People from Voss
Norwegian male freestyle skiers
Olympic freestyle skiers of Norway
Freestyle skiers at the 1994 Winter Olympics
Sportspeople from Vestland